The 2012 IIHF U18 Challenge Cup of Asia was the first IIHF U18 Challenge Cup of Asia, an annual international ice hockey tournament held by the International Ice Hockey Federation (IIHF). It took place between 1 April and 6 April 2012 in Abu Dhabi, United Arab Emirates. Thailand won the tournament after winning all four of their round robin games and finishing first in the standings. The United Arab Emirates finished second, losing only to Thailand and Malaysia finished in third place.

Overview
The 2012 IIHF U18 Challenge Cup of Asia began on 1 April 2012 in Abu Dhabi, United Arab Emirates with all of the games being played at Arena Abu Dhabi. The under-18 teams of India, Malaysia and the United Arab Emirates made their debut international appearances at the tournament while the Thailand under-18 returned to international competition, having last played in the 2002 IIHF Asian Oceanic U18 Championship. Thailand won the tournament after winning all four of their games and finishing first in the standings. The United Arab Emirates finished second, losing only to Thailand and Malaysia finished third after losing their games against Thailand and the United Arab Emirates. Phongphan Krongsakunsuk of Thailand finished as the tournaments leading scoring with 22 points including 15 goals and seven assists. Thailand's Wasunun Angkulpattanasuk finished as the leading goaltender with as save percentage of 90.00.

Hong Kong, also making their debut international under-18 competition, sent a select team that competed out of competition against the other four nations. Hong Kong was unable to compete in the tournament due to problems with player eligibility. The team won all four of their games against the other nations but the scores were officially recorded as 5–0 wins to the opposing teams.

Standings

Fixtures
All times local.

Scoring leaders
List shows the top ten skaters sorted by points, then goals, assists, and the lower penalties in minutes.

Leading goaltenders
Only the top goaltenders, based on save percentage, who have played at least 40% of their team's minutes are included in this list.

Notes
 I Hong Kong originally won the games 20–0 versus India, 26–0 Malaysia, 13–0 versus the United Arab Emirates and 9–0 versus Thailand before the games were declared forfeit at a score of 5–0 to the opposing teams.

References

External links
International Ice Hockey Federation

Chal
IIHF Challenge Cups of Asia
International ice hockey competitions hosted by the United Arab Emirates
IIHF U18
IIHF Asian Oceanic U18 Championships
Asian ice hockey competitions for junior teams